Montgomery Township is one of eleven townships in Jennings County, Indiana, USA.  As of the 2010 census, its population was 978 and it contained 416 housing units.

Geography
The streams of Bear Creek, Davis Branch and Little Bear Creek run through this township.

Unincorporated towns
 Commiskey
 Hilltown
 Paris
 Paris Crossing

Adjacent townships
 Lovett Township (north)
 Lancaster Township, Jefferson County (east)
 Graham Township, Jefferson County (south)
 Marion Township (west)

Cemeteries
The township contains one cemetery, Hopewell.

Major highways
  Indiana State Road 3
  Indiana State Road 250

References
 U.S. Board on Geographic Names (GNIS)
 United States Census Bureau cartographic boundary files

External links
 Indiana Township Association
 United Township Association of Indiana

Townships in Jennings County, Indiana
Townships in Indiana